West Peak, el. , is a mountain peak in the Highland Mountains in Madison County, Montana.  It rises due west from Table Mountain in the same range. The peak is located in the Deerlodge National Forest.  The headwaters of Hell's Canyon Creek, a significant tributary of the Jefferson River  flow off the southeast face of the peak.

See also
 Mountains of Madison County, Montana

Notes

Mountains of Montana